The 2019 Atlantic Coast Conference women's soccer tournament was the 32nd edition of the ACC Women's Soccer Tournament. The tournament decided the Atlantic Coast Conference champion and guaranteed representative into the 2019 NCAA Division I Women's Soccer Tournament. The semifinals and final were played at Sahlen's Stadium in Cary, NC.

The defending champions were the Florida State Seminoles. The Seminoles fell in their title defense in the semifinals, losing to Virginia.  North Carolina beat Virginia in the final, 2–1, to claim their twenty-second ACC title.  It was coach Anson Dorrance's twenty-second title as well.

Qualification 

The top eight teams in the Atlantic Coast Conference earned a berth into the ACC Tournament. The quarterfinal round was held at campus sites, while the semifinals and final took place at Sahlen's Stadium in Cary, North Carolina.

Bracket

Schedule

Quarterfinals

Semifinals

Final

Statistics

Goalscorers 
3 Goals
 Alessia Russo – North Carolina

 2 Goals
 Lotte Wubben-Moy – North Carolina

1 Goal
 Macyee Bell – North Carolina
 Lauren Bruns – Clemson
 Deyna Castellanos – Florida State
 Jaelin Howell – Florida State
 Tziarra King – NC State
 Rebecca Jarrett – Virginia
 Rachel Jones – North Carolina
 Meghan McCool – Virginia
 Kristen McFarland – Florida State
 Zoe Morse – Virginia
 Ru Mucherera – North Carolina
 Diana Ordoñez – Virginia
 Brookylnn Rivers – Louisville

All Tournament Team

MVP in bold
Source:

See also 
 Atlantic Coast Conference
 2019 Atlantic Coast Conference women's soccer season
 2019 NCAA Division I women's soccer season
 2019 NCAA Division I Women's Soccer Tournament

References 

ACC Women's Soccer Tournament
2019 Atlantic Coast Conference women's soccer season